Keith Maillard (born 28 February 1942 in Wheeling, West Virginia) is a Canadian-American novelist, poet, and professor of creative writing at the University of British Columbia. He moved to Canada in 1970 (due to his opposition to the Vietnam War) and became a Canadian citizen in 1976.

Family background 

Maillard has French, Canadian, and American roots. His Huguenots great grandparents immigrated to Montreal from Lyon, France, in the early 1880s. His Maillard grandfather and two Montreal-born uncles continued the family tradition of glass-blowing, working for Dominion Glass in Montreal and in Redcliff, Alberta.

Maillard's parents divorced when he was a baby and he never knew his father. His father, Eugene C. Maillard, avoided glassblowing work, trained as a draughtsman, and worked for twenty-five years at the Hanford Site nuclear plant in Richland, Washington. Maillard's mother's family settled in the Ohio River Valley in the late 18th century and it is from her family stories that Maillard draws inspiration for much of his historical fiction. He describes the process of his earliest childhood fiction in his 2011 essay, "Kilroy: A Writer's Childhood."

Keith Maillard is married with two daughters and lives in West Vancouver. His mother-in-law is Canadian novelist Rohan O'Grady.

Career

1960s 

Maillard left his native West Virginia in 1965 and moved to Boston where he lived for five years. He worked in the anti-Vietnam-war movement from 1968-1970 and contributed numerous articles to Boston underground newspapers and radio. In 1970, disillusioned after the Kent State shootings, he emigrated to Canada. He was not eligible for the draft and was a war resister rather than a draft dodger.

1970s 

In the early 1970s, Maillard worked as a freelancer for CBC Radio, contributing pieces to This Country in the Morning, Five Nights, and Our Native Land. He also contributed to periodicals, including Fusion, Body Politic, Malahat Review, Books in Canada, Canadian Literature, and newspapers. He was in the Writers' Union of Canada, served on the National Council for two years, and co-founded the Federation of BC Writers. Maillard studied music at Vancouver Community College, played the Irish pipes, taught recorder and the rudiments of music for the Vancouver School Board and Vancouver Community College, and played bass in the first band formed by Vancouver singer-songwriter, Ferron. In the late 1970s Maillard taught writing workshops in Vancouver's literary centre, The Literary Storefront, and participated in a number of readings and other events there. In 1979 Maillard interviewed Canadian novelist Howard O’Hagan who explained to him his writing process; the interview appeared as a chapter in Margery Fee's Silence Made Visible: Howard O’Hagan and Tay John (1992).

Maillard's first published novel, Two Strand River, appeared in 1976, published by Dave Godfrey's Press Porcépic. Most reviewers were confounded by this strange book with its cross-gendered protagonists and weird events, but Two Strand River soon acquired a cult following, came to be labeled a classic of Canadian magic realism, and has been republished twice.

1980s 

Maillard's second published novel was actually the first one he had begun; the book rejected by 26 publishers finally – after having passed through eight major rewrites – appeared in 1980 as Alex Driving South. In this gritty, naturalistic tale, Maillard first introduced the fictional town of Raysburg, West Virginia, where most of his novels have been set. The Knife in My Hands, influenced by American writer Jack Kerouac, followed in 1981, and its sequel, Cutting Through, in 1982. Then, with a fifth book half-completed, Maillard was afflicted with writer's block.

From 1985 through 1988 Maillard applied his writing skills to designing university and adult education courses for the Open Learning Agency and, from 1986–1989, he workshopped his screenplay, Two Strand River, with Patricia Gruben's Praxis Film Development Workshop (Simon Fraser University).

Maillard's fifth novel, Motet, published in 1989, won the Ethel Wilson Fiction Prize. Reviewer David Homel assured readers that despite the novel's sixteenth-century Dutch choral mystery and Vancouver setting, "power and madness made in the USA is still at the heart of Maillard's creativity."

Having taught as a sessional lecturer at both the University of British Columbia (UBC) and Simon Fraser University, Maillard was appointed in 1989 to a regular teaching position in UBC's Creative Writing Department, where he has taught every genre except stage writing. He served as Advisory Editor of PRISM international for 10 years.

1990s 

While at UBC, Maillard began what he considers his mature work – what has come to be known as the "Raysburg Series." Called "a small masterpiece" by the Georgia Straight, Light in the Company of Women was published in 1993 and was runner-up for the Ethel Wilson Fiction Prize. It was followed in 1995 by Hazard Zones, which was included on the Toronto Star'''s list of the best Canadian books for that year and was short-listed for the Commonwealth Writers' Prize.

Maillard's novel, Gloria (1999), was well received in Canada, short-listed for the Governor General's Literary Award for Fiction, and brought him national attention in the United States.GLORIA by Keith Maillard, starred review, Kirkus Reviews, 1 July, 2000

Maillard also returned to his first love, poetry, and published Dementia Americana, which won the Gerald Lampert Award for the best first book of poetry published in Canada. He became interested in the re-emergence of formal poetry in North America and commented about it in his oft-cited essay, "The New Formalism and the Return of Prosody."Gerry Cambridge, "The New Formalism," Jay Parini, ed., The Oxford Encyclopedia of American Literature (Oxford University Press, 2004), 251, 253-54.Keith Maillard, review of Rebel Angels, The Antigonish Review, 109 (1999).Catherine Addison, A Genealogy of the Verse Novel (Cambridge Scholars Publishing, 2017), 424.

 2000s 

The last of the "Raysburg Series", The Clarinet Polka (2002), was well received in the United States, particularly by the Polish American community.William Hal Gorby, "Saints, Sinners, and Socialists on the Southside: Polish Catholic Immigrant Workers, Politics, and Culture in Wheeling, West Virginia, 1890-1930," PhD thesis, University of West Virginia (2014), 2, 120, 123, 124, 128, 129, 351, 355-56. It received starred reviews from Library Journal, Publishers Weekly, Booklist, and Kirkus Reviews, and was included in Booklist’s Editors’ Choice ’03. It won the Polish American Historical Association's Creative Arts Prize, and came to the attention of scholars in Poland.Polish American Historical Association Creative Arts Prize

Maillard was one of 35 writers placed on the West Virginia Literary Map in 2004 and he was inducted that year into the Wheeling, West Virginia, Hall of Fame.

In 2004, Maillard returned to the raw Bildungsroman material first published in The Knife in My Hands and Cutting Through and rewrote and reshaped it into the Difficulty at the Beginning quartet, which appeared in four volumes between September 2005 and September 2006. The Toronto The Globe and Mail selected Difficulty at the Beginning as one of the top books of 2006, calling it "a work of terrible beauty and grace, a masterpiece fit to contend with the best novels of the last century."Tom Sandborn, "The '60s on the installment plan," The Globe and Mail, 21 October 2006. Reviewer Richard Helm describes the quartet as Maillard's "magnum opus and the keystone of a literary career that has flown largely under the Canadian radar." He characterizes Maillard as "probably the most famous Canadian novelist you've never heard of."

In 2006, with eleven out of fourteen titles nominated for or winners of literary awards, Maillard won UBC's Dorothy Somerset Award for excellence in the creative arts.

 2010s 

In its 80th anniversary edition in 2015, the Quill & Quire listed Maillard as one of Canada's "notable Canlit talent" along with other American-born anti-Vietnam-War authors, Philip Marchand, Jack Todd, Judith Merrill, Mark Frutkin, and William Gibson.

In his most recent novel Twin Studies (2018) -- set in Vancouver, Medicine Hat, and Los Angeles—Maillard returns to the topic of gender fluidity that he first explored in Two Strand River in 1976.Theo Dombrowski, "Gender, manga, and teen idiom," BC BookLook, 22 January 2019. Apple's iBooks reviewed the novel and described it as " a fascinating exploration of wealth, class, and gender fluidity [that] reads like a 21st-century Canadian version of Dickens' London novels." Steven Beattie, in the September 2018 issue of Quill & Quire, notes that Maillard's subject matter arises out of lived experience. "When the author began publishing, the language for describing gender-fluid approaches did not exist." As Maillard himself put it in his interview with Beattie, "You can't apply a term to yourself unless it is culturally available. I would now call myself non-binary."

The Vancouver Sun summarized Twin Studies as "that rare work: a story that grapples with difficult intellectual issues without ever abandoning the novelist's primary duty -- compelling narrative." Maillard’s novel challenges the idea of isolated nuclear families and envisions what he says is “ a fluid larger family, in which people come together for other reasons. I think it's essential that we start rethinking family, that we start rethinking our connections to each other.”Twin Studies won the Alberta Book of the Year Award from the Book Publishers Association of Alberta and was shortlisted for the Relit Award. In an interview with Quentin Mills-Fenn of Prairie books Now, Maillard explained that his book explores ”the impact of traumatic experiences,” and that he firmly believes that “[p]hysicians and therapists who work with children and adolescents are telling us that a gender-affirming point of view from parents and, if possible, from the surrounding culture, makes for healthy and happy kids."

Maillard's first non-fiction book, Fatherless: A Memoir (2019), traces the life of the mysterious father he never knew, and was well received in Canada.Sue Carter, "Keith Maillard talks about his absentee father's 'one last gut punch from the grave,' " Toronto Star, 21 November 2019.Andrew Armitage, "Another Memory Courtesy of Keith Maillard," Sun Times, Owen Sound, January 4, 2020. CBC Arts columnist and creative nonfiction author/editor Alicia Elliott writes that Maillard's memoir "gives us a model of not only self awareness and honesty but also, more importantly, healing." Appalachian Review praises Fatherless as “a book that is sometimes heartbreaking, often lighthearted, and always honest,” noting that “Maillard manages to examine the roughest edges of his family history with harsh truth without begging for the reader’s sympathy.”

 2020s 

Author and scholar Daniel Heath Justice praises Maillard’s second book of non-fiction, The Bridge: Writing Across the Binary (2021). “Through constellated fragments of memory, key moments in twentieth-century America, and the unfolding of an acclaimed literary life,” Justice writes, “The Bridge is the forthright, deeply moving memoir of a nonbinary writer coming of age and coming to self.” Calling Keith Maillard “one of the finest English-language novelists in Canada today,” The Vancouver Sun writes that “Maillard understands his life through the lens of a lifelong struggle to know and accept his own identity off the simple-minded male/female binary.” 

Maillard's papers are currently held by the University of British Columbia's Rare Books and Special Collections. A complete list of Maillard's publications can be found on his website.

 Awards and recognition 
 1986: winner Praxis Competition, Two Strand River 1990: winner Ethel Wilson Fiction Prize, Motet 1994: runner-up Ethel Wilson Fiction Prize, Light in the Company of Women 1995: winner Gerald Lampert Award, Dementia Americana 1996: shortlisted Commonwealth Writers' Prize, Hazard Zones 1999: fiction finalist, Governor General's Awards, Gloria 2004: winner West Virginia Literary Merit Award
 2005: winner Polish American Historical Association Creative Arts Prize, The Clarinet Polka 2005: shortlisted Weatherford Award, Running 2006: longlisted ReLit Awards, Looking Good 2006: shortlisted Weatherford Award, Morgantown 2006: shortlisted Weatherford Award, Lyndon Johnston and the Majorettes 2006: winner Dorothy Somerset Award for Excellence in the Creative Arts
 2018: The Globe 100, Twin Studies 2019: winner Alberta Book of the Year Award: Trade Fiction, Twin Studies 2019: shortlisted ReLit Awards, Twin Studies Bibliography 
 1976: Two Strand River (Press Porcepic) 
 1982 reissue: Two Strand River (General Publishing) 
 1996 reissue: Two Strand River (HarperCollins) 
 2013 reissue: Two Strand River (Keith Maillard) ebook  
 1980: Alex Driving South (Dial Press) 
 1983 reissue: Alex Driving South (General Publishing) 
 2013 reissue: Alex Driving South (Keith Maillard) ebook 
 1981: The Knife in my Hands (General) 
 1982 reissue: The Knife in my Hands (Beaufort) 
 1982: Cutting Through (Stoddart) 
 1983 reissue: Cutting Through (Beaufort) 
 1989: Motet (Random House) 
 1997 reissue: Motet (HarperCollins) 
 1998 reissue: Motet (Harvill Press) 
 2013 reissue: Motet (Keith Maillard) ebook 
 1993: Light in the Company of Women (HarperCollins) 
 1994: Dementia Americana, poems (Ronsdale/Cacanadadada) 
 1995: Hazard Zones (Harper Perennial) 
 1999: Gloria (Harper Flamingo) 
 2000: reissue: Gloria (Soho Press) 
 2001: reissue: Gloria (HarperFlamingo) 
 2002: The Clarinet Polka (Thomas Allen) 
 2003: reissue: The Clarinet Polka (St.Martin's Press) 
 2004: reissue: The Clarinet Polka (St.Martin's Griffin) 
 2005: Running (Brindle & Glass) 
 2011: Running (Brindle & Glass) ebook 
 2006: Morgantown (Brindle & Glass) 
 2011: Morgantown (Brindle & Glass) ebook 
 2006: Lyndon Johnson and the Majorettes (Brindle & Glass) 
 2011: Lyndon Johnson and the Majorettes (Brindle & Glass) ebook 
 2006: Looking Good (Brindle & Glass) 
 2011: Looking Good (Brindle & Glass) ebook 
 2018: Twin Studies (Freehand Press) 
 2018: Twin Studies (Audible) audiobook 
 2019: Fatherless (University of West Virginia Press) 
 2021: The Bridge: Writing Across the Binary (Freehand Press) 	
 2023: In the Defense of Liberty (Freehand Press) 

 Anthologized 

 1985: Vancouver Fiction. David Watmough, ed., Winlaw, B.C., (Polestar Press) 
 1986: Magic Realism and Canadian Literature: Essays and Stories, Proceedings of the Conference on Magic Realist Writing in Canada. University of Waterloo/Wilfrid Laurier University, May 1985; Peter and Ed Jewinski, eds. (University of Waterloo Press) 
 1999: New Expansive Poetry. R.S. Gwynn, ed., Ashland, Oregon, (Story Line Press) 
 2005: Wild Sweet Notes II: More Great Poetry From West Virginia. (Publishers Place) 
 2008: The Best of Canadian Poetry in English, 2008. Stephanie Bolster and Molly Peacock, eds., (Tightrope Books) 
 2008: Crossing Lines: Poets Who Came to Canada in the Vietnam War. Allan Briesmaster and Steven Michael Berzensky, eds., (Seraphim Editions) 
 2014: Naked in Academe: Celebrating Fifty Years of Creative Writing at UBC. Rhea Tregebov, ed., (McClelland & Stewart) 
 2018: Refuse: Canlit in Ruins''. Hannah McGregor, Julie Rak & Erin Wunker, eds., (Book*hug)

References

External links 
 Official website
 BC Bookworld profile
 West Virginia Wesleyan College / Annie Merner Pfeiffer Library: Keith Maillard profile
 "Keith Maillard," Contemporary Authors Online: Keith Maillard profile
 Ohio County Public Library, "Wheeling Hall of Fame: Keith Maillard"

1942 births
Living people
American emigrants to Canada
Canadian male novelists
20th-century Canadian poets
20th-century Canadian novelists
20th-century Canadian male writers
21st-century Canadian male writers
21st-century Canadian novelists
Canadian male poets
Canadian non-binary writers
Writers from Wheeling, West Virginia
Writers from British Columbia
Academic staff of the University of British Columbia
West Virginia University
Canadian LGBT novelists
Canadian LGBT poets
Non-binary novelists
21st-century Canadian LGBT people
20th-century Canadian LGBT people